Kumpur is a village development committee in Dhading District in Province No. 3 in central Nepal. At the time of the 1991 Nepal census it had a population of 7916 and had 1405 houses in it.

References

Populated places in Dhading District